Tenerife Province may refer to:
 Santa Cruz de Tenerife Province, Spain
 Tenerife Province (Colombia)